Igor Viktorovich Vyazmikin (January 8, 1966 – October 30, 2009) was a professional ice hockey forward, who played for CSKA.  He was the final player selected in the 1987 NHL Entry Draft, going in the twelfth round, 252nd overall, to the Edmonton Oilers, and went on to play four NHL games with that team.  Additionally, Vyazmikin played extensively in Europe and North American minor leagues.

Vyazmikin was born in Moscow, Soviet Union, and represented the Soviet Union twice internationally, at the 1984 and 1986 World Junior Championships. He died on October 30, 2009, from a long illness. He was 43 years old.

Career statistics

Regular season and playoffs

International

Awards 
EJC-A All-Star Team (1983, 1984)
Named Best Forward at EJC-A (1983)
WJC-A All-Star Team (1986)

External links

References 

1966 births
2009 deaths
Cape Breton Oilers players
Edmonton Oilers draft picks
Edmonton Oilers players
HC CSKA Moscow players
HC Khimik Voskresensk players
Severstal Cherepovets players
Ilves players
Milwaukee Admirals (IHL) players
Ice hockey people from Moscow
Phoenix Roadrunners (IHL) players
Russian ice hockey left wingers
SHC Fassa players
Soviet ice hockey left wingers
Soviet expatriate ice hockey players
Soviet expatriate sportspeople in Canada
Expatriate ice hockey players in Canada
Russian expatriate sportspeople in Finland
Russian expatriate sportspeople in the United States
Russian expatriate sportspeople in Denmark
Russian expatriate sportspeople in Italy
Russian expatriate ice hockey people
Expatriate ice hockey players in Denmark
Expatriate ice hockey players in Italy
Expatriate ice hockey players in the United States
Expatriate ice hockey players in Finland